Dorbod railway station, formerly Taikang railway station, is a railway station of Harbin–Manzhouli Railway, and located in Dorbod Mongol Autonomous County, Daqing, Heilongjiang, China.

Railway stations in Heilongjiang
Daqing
Stations on the Harbin–Qiqihar Intercity Railway